In economics, saving-investment balance or I-S balance is a balance of national savings and national investment, which is equal to current account. This relationship is obtained from the national income identity.

Description
This is the national income identity:

where
Y: GDP,
C: national consumption,
I: national investment,
G: government spending,
EX: export,
IM: import,
EX－IM: current account.

The national income identity can be rewritten as following:

where T is defined as tax. (Y-T-C) is savings of private sector and (T-G) is savings of government. Here, we define S as  National savings (= savings of private sector + savings of government) and rewrite the identity as following:

This identity implies that the difference of national savings and national investment is equal to current account.

See also
Global imbalances
Global saving glut

References

International finance